Emamzadeh Khalifeh (also Romanized as Emāmzādeh Khalīfeh) is a village in Rudpey-ye Shomali Rural District, in the Central District of Sari County, Mazandaran Province, Iran. At the 2006 census, its population was 55, in 12 families.

References 

Populated places in Sari County